, born , is a Japanese actress.

Filmography
 1963: The Insect Woman
 1964: Unholy Desire
 1964: Kunoichi Keshō
 1967: Zatoichi's Cane Sword
 1968: The Human Bullet
 1968: Curse of the Blood
 1974: Pastoral: To Die in the Country
 1974: Tora-san's Lullaby
 1975–1979: Torakku Yarō
 1975–1994: Edo o Kiru
 1978: Pink Lady no Katsudō Daishashin
 1978-87: Abarenbō Shōgun
 1980: Shogun's Ninja
 1987: Hachiko Monogatari
 1992: Tōki Rakujitsu

References

External links
 
 

Japanese actresses
Living people
1935 births